Adesope Olajide (born 4 March 1977) known professionally as Shopsydoo OR Energy Gawd,  is a Nigerian UK based Media personality, radio and television personality, talk show host, event host and podcaster.
He is the host of The Afrobeats Podcast, (an afro pop and afrobeats culture show).

Early life and education
Adesope Olajide was born at Ibadan, Nigeria. He had his early education at Ibadan, and commenced his Secondary School at Loyola College, Ibadan . He studied at University of Ado Ekiti in Ado-Ekiti and earned a bachelor's degree in Botany. After his University Education, Adesope moved to the United Kingdom in 2002.

Media career

Radio and television
Adesope began his media career in 2003 and first worked at  N -Power FM London. He later joined Voice of Africa Radio London and served as an online host for Factory 78 TV Network in 2010.
Early 2014, he joined Vox Africa TV UK (the first pan-African, bilingual and independent television channel in UK)  as host of "Live at Battersea". He also served as host of Nolly Afrobeats on Nollywood Movies Sky 329. He served as anchor for Ben Television Sports Show "ABC Sports".
In 2014 Adesocpe served as host of weekly music program " Afrohits on The Beat” at The Beat London 103.6FM, a position he held for a period of ten years.

Podcast
He started a weekly podcast show The Afrobeats Podcast, (an afro pop and afrobeats culture show) in September 2020 and has been a recurring guest such as: Stonebwoy, CKay , Rema, Fuse ODG, Brymo, Don Jazzy, Sarkodie, Camidoh, King Promise,Fireboy DML, Darkovibes,King Promise,Ruger, Timaya , Diamond Platnumz, Yemi Alade, Gyakie, Blaqbonez, among others.

Awards and nominations

References

Living people
1977 births
Nigerian Christians
Nigerian radio presenters
Nigerian television presenters
Nigerian media personalities
British people of Nigerian descent
Podcasters